Nudaria nanlingica is a moth of the subfamily Arctiinae. It is found in Guangdong, China.

References

Nudariina